The Ohlsson's Cape Breweries was a South African brewing company located in Newlands, Cape Town. It was founded around 1881 by a Swedish immigrant and industrialist, Anders Ohlsson. Ohlsson's was bought out by Castle Breweries and merged to form South African Breweries in 1956. South African Breweries continued to sell locally produced beer under the Ohlsson's brand until its discontinuation in the late 1990s.

References 

Food and drink companies established in 1881
19th-century establishments in South Africa
Food and drink companies based in Cape Town
Manufacturing companies based in Cape Town
Breweries of South Africa
South African brands
1881 establishments in the Cape Colony
Newlands, Cape Town